The Doctor's Tale is a Big Finish Productions audio drama based on the long-running British science fiction television series Doctor Who and the second to be released in the Early Adventures series. The story was written by Marc Platt and starred William Russell and Maureen O'Brien.

Cast

William Russell as Ian Chesterton and The Doctor
Maureen O'Brien as Vicki, Barbara Wright and Narrator
Alice Haig as Isabella
Gareth Armstrong as Geoffrey Chaucer
Joseph Kloska as Sir Robert de Wensley
John Banks as Thomas Arundel

Other parts played by members of the cast.

Continuity

Ian was knighted "Sir Ian of Jaffa" by King Richard I of England in the 1965 story The Crusade.

References

External links

The Doctor's Tale trailer

Doctor Who: The Early Adventures audio plays
First Doctor stories
2014 audio plays
First Doctor audio plays
Audio plays by Marc Platt